Podpulfrca (in older sources Podpurflica) is a small settlement in the Municipality of Škofja Loka in the Upper Carniola region of Slovenia.

Name
Podpulfrca is also known as Podpurfelca in the local dialect. The name is a fused prepositional phrase: pod 'below' + pulfrca 'gunpowder mill'. The latter element refers from a stamp mill used for producing gunpowder that was located there, and in 1584 the name of the village was recorded as Pulferstamph 'gunpowder mill' (i.e., German Pulverstampf).

References

External links

Podpulfrca at Geopedia

Populated places in the Municipality of Škofja Loka